Cone cells, or cones, are photoreceptor cells in the retinas of vertebrate eyes including the human eye. They respond differently to light of different wavelengths, and the combination of their responses is responsible for color vision. Cones function best in relatively bright light, called the photopic region, as opposed to rod cells, which work better in dim light, or the scotopic region. Cone cells are densely packed in the fovea centralis, a 0.3 mm diameter rod-free area with very thin, densely packed cones which quickly reduce in number towards the periphery of the retina. Conversely, they are absent from the optic disc, contributing to the blind spot. There are about six to seven million cones in a human eye (vs ~92 million rods), with the highest concentration being towards the macula.

Cones are less sensitive to light than the rod cells in the retina (which support vision at low light levels), but allow the perception of color. They are also able to perceive finer detail and more rapid changes in images because their response times to stimuli are faster than those of rods. Cones are normally one of three types: S-cones, M-cones and L-cones. Each type expresses a different opsin: OPN1SW, OPN1MW, and OPN1LW, respectively. These cones are sensitive to visible wavelengths of light that correspond to short-wavelength, medium-wavelength and longer-wavelength light respectively. Because humans usually have three kinds of cones with different photopsins, which have different response curves and thus respond to variation in color in different ways, humans have trichromatic vision. Being color blind can change this, and there have been some verified reports of people with four types of cones, giving them tetrachromatic vision.
The three pigments responsible for detecting light have been shown to vary in their exact chemical composition due to genetic mutation; different individuals will have cones with different color sensitivity.

Structure

Types
Humans normally have three types of cones, usually designated L, M and S for long, medium and short wavelengths respectively. The first responds the most to light of the longer red wavelengths, peaking at about 560 nm. The majority of the human cones are of the long type. The second most common type responds the most to light of yellow to green medium-wavelength, peaking at 530 nm. M cones make up about a third of cones in the human eye. The third type responds the most to blue short-wavelength light, peaking at 420 nm, and make up only around 2% of the cones in the human retina. The three types have peak wavelengths in the range of 564–580 nm, 534–545 nm, and 420–440 nm, respectively, depending on the individual. Such a difference is caused by the different opsins they carry, OPN1LW, OPN1MW, and OPN1SW, respectively, the forms of which affect the absorption of retinaldehyde. The CIE 1931 color space is an often-used model of spectral sensitivities of the three cells of an average human.

While it has been discovered that there exists a mixed type of bipolar cells that bind to both rod and cone cells, bipolar cells still predominantly receive their input from cone cells.

Other animals might have a different number of cone types (see Color vision).

Shape and arrangement

Cone cells are somewhat shorter than rods, but wider and tapered, and are much less numerous than rods in most parts of the retina, but greatly outnumber rods in the fovea. Structurally, cone cells have a cone-like shape at one end where a pigment filters incoming light, giving them their different response curves. They are typically 40–50 µm long, and their diameter varies from 0.5 to 4.0 µm, being smallest and most tightly packed at the center of the eye at the fovea. The S cone spacing is slightly larger than the others.

Photobleaching can be used to determine cone arrangement. This is done by exposing dark-adapted retina to a certain wavelength of light that paralyzes the particular type of cone sensitive to that wavelength for up to thirty minutes from being able to dark-adapt, making it appear white in contrast to the grey dark-adapted cones when a picture of the retina is taken. The results illustrate that S cones are randomly placed and appear much less frequently than the M and L cones. The ratio of M and L cones varies greatly among different people with regular vision (e.g. values of 75.8% L with 20.0% M versus 50.6% L with 44.2% M in two male subjects).

Like rods, each cone cell has a synaptic terminal, inner (nearer the brain) and outer segments, as well as an interior nucleus and various mitochondria. The synaptic terminal forms a synapse with a neuron bipolar cell. The inner and outer segments are connected by a cilium. The inner segment contains organelles and the cell's nucleus, while the outer segment contains the light-absorbing materials.

The outer segments of cones have invaginations of their cell membranes that create stacks of membranous disks. Photopigments exist as transmembrane proteins within these disks, which provide more surface area for light to affect the pigments. In cones, these disks are attached to the outer membrane, whereas they are pinched off and exist separately in rods. Neither rods nor cones divide, but their membranous disks wear out and are worn off at the end of the outer segment, to be consumed and recycled by phagocytic cells.

Function

The difference in the signals received from the three cone types allows the brain to perceive a continuous range of colors, through the opponent process of color vision. (Rod cells have a peak sensitivity at 498 nm, roughly halfway between the peak sensitivities of the S and M cones.)

All of the receptors contain the protein photopsin, with variations in its conformation causing differences in the optimum wavelengths absorbed.

The color yellow, for example, is perceived when the L cones are stimulated slightly more than the M cones, and the color red is perceived when the L cones are stimulated significantly more than the M cones. Similarly, blue and violet hues are perceived when the S receptor is stimulated more. S Cones are most sensitive to light at wavelengths around 420 nm. However, the lens and cornea of the human eye are increasingly absorptive to shorter wavelengths, and this sets the short wavelength limit of human-visible light to approximately 380 nm, which is therefore called 'ultraviolet' light. People with aphakia, a condition where the eye lacks a lens, sometimes report the ability to see into the ultraviolet range. At moderate to bright light levels where the cones function, the eye is more sensitive to yellowish-green light than other colors because this stimulates the two most common (M and L) of the three kinds of cones almost equally. At lower light levels, where only the rod cells function, the sensitivity is greatest at a blueish-green wavelength.

Cones also tend to possess a significantly elevated visual acuity because each cone cell has a lone connection to the optic nerve, therefore, the cones have an easier time telling that two stimuli are isolated. Separate connectivity is established in the
inner plexiform layer so that each connection is parallel.

The response of cone cells to light is also directionally nonuniform, peaking at a direction that receives light from the center of the pupil; this effect is known as the Stiles–Crawford effect.

It is possible that S cones may play a role in the regulation of the circadian system and the secretion of melatonin but this role is not clear yet. The exact contribution of S cone activation to circadian regulation is unclear but any potential role would be secondary to the better established role of melanopsin.

Color afterimage 
Sensitivity to a prolonged stimulation tends to decline over time, leading to neural adaptation. An interesting effect occurs when staring at a particular color for a minute or so. Such action leads to an exhaustion of the cone cells that respond to that color – resulting in the afterimage. This vivid color aftereffect can last for a minute or more.

Associated diseases
 Achromatopsia (Rod monochromacy) - a form of monochromacy with no functional cones
 Blue cone monochromacy - a rare form of monochromacy with only functional S-cones
 Congenital red–green color blindness - partial color blindness include protanopia, deuteranopia, etc.
 Oligocone trichromacy - poor visual acuity and impairment of cone function according to ERG, but without significant color vision loss.
 Bradyopsia - photopic vision cannot respond quickly to stimuli.
 Bornholm eye disease - X-linked recessive myopia, astigmatism, impaired visual acuity and red-green dichromacy.
 Cone dystrophy - a degenerative loss of cone cells
 Retinoblastoma - a type of cancer originating from cone precursor cells

See also

 Disc shedding
 Double cones
 RG color space
 Tetrachromacy
 Melanopsin
 Color vision

References

External links
 Cell Centered Database – cone cell
 Photoreceptors - Webvision
 NIF Search – Cone Cell via the Neuroscience Information Framework
 Model and image of cone cell

Color vision
Photoreceptor cells
Human eye anatomy
Human cells
Neurons